Adam George Huckle (born 21 September 1971) is a Zimbabwean former international cricketer who played in eight Test matches and 19 One Day Internationals (ODI) from 1997 to 1999 for the Zimbabwe national team.

In his second Test in 1997, against New Zealand, Huckle took 11–255 in the match (6–109 and 5–146).  As of 2013, this remains the only occasion when a Zimbabwean bowler has taken 11 wickets in a Test match. His aggressive appealing in the match led to a fine by referee Sidath Wettimuny for attempting to intimidate the umpire. He was filmed shepherding a dismissed batsman off the field with a well known two-word goodbye. When interrogated by the relevant cricketing body at a subsequent hearing, Huckle explained: "Well, we weren't playing netball".

Huckle's father, Mike Huckle, played a single first-class match for Rhodesia in the 1960s.

External links
 
"Adam Huckle - a short biography" by John Ward at Cricinfo

1971 births
Living people
Cricketers from Bulawayo
White Zimbabwean sportspeople
Alumni of Falcon College
Zimbabwean cricketers
Zimbabwe Test cricketers
Zimbabwe One Day International cricketers
Eastern Province cricketers
Matabeleland cricketers
Commonwealth Games competitors for Zimbabwe
Cricketers at the 1998 Commonwealth Games
Cricketers at the 1999 Cricket World Cup